Richard Vaughan (c.1550 – 30 March 1607) was a Welsh bishop of the Church of England.

Life
His father was Thomas ap Robert Fychan of Llŷn, Caernarfonshire. He was educated at St John's College, Cambridge, where he graduated BA in 1574, MA in 1577, and DD in 1589. He became chaplain to John Aylmer, Bishop of London, who is said to have been a relative.

Vaughan assisted William Morgan in his translation of the Bible into Welsh, published in 1588.

He was rector of Chipping Ongar from 1578 to 1580, and of Little Canfield in 1580; Archdeacon of Middlesex in 1588; rector of Great Dunmow and Moreton in 1592, and of Stanford Rivers in 1594. He became Bishop of Bangor in 1595, Bishop of Chester in 1597, was Bishop of London from 1604 to 1607.

His views were Calvinist, and he signed and is presumed to have had input into the Lambeth Articles of 1595. He licensed in 1606 the translation of the work Institutiones Theologicae of the Reformed theologian Guillaume Du Buc (Gulielmus Bucanus) of Lausanne, carried out by Robert Hill. As Bishop of London he was generally sympathetic to moderate Puritan clergy; but he did take action in suspending Stephen Egerton.

References

Attribution

1550 births
1607 deaths
Bishops of London
Archdeacons of Middlesex
Bishops of Chester
Bishops of Bangor
16th-century Welsh Anglican bishops
17th-century Church of England bishops
Alumni of St John's College, Cambridge
16th-century Anglican theologians
17th-century Anglican theologians